Hrastovac  may refer to:

 Hrastovac, Bosnia and Herzegovina, village near Kakanj
 Hrastovac, Bjelovar-Bilogora County, village near Garešnica in Croatia
 Hrastovac, Osijek-Baranja County, village in the Vuka municipality in Croatia